A Kiss of Shadows is an erotic horror novel by American writer Laurell K. Hamilton, the first book in the Merry Gentry series.

Plot introduction

A faerie princess turned private investigator in a world where faeries are not only known to the general public, but are also popular, the heroine is Princess Meredith NicEssus. As niece to Andais, The Queen of Air and Darkness, she is a royal of the Unseelie Court, however having fled the court three years before she has been hiding herself under the name of Merry Gentry and working as a private investigator for the Grey Detective Agency.

Plot summary

The story begins in Los Angeles, California, in a world where magical creatures are "out of the closet" and, in some cases, even legal. Princess Meredith NicEssus is working for the Grey Detective Agency under the assumed name of Meredith 'Merry' Gentry. When two women come to the agency with a story about fey-wannabes and rituals involving fey women, Merry goes undercover to investigate. However, she and her colleagues get more than they bargained for when it is discovered that the culprit is using Branwyn's Tears, an illegal oil that can make a human appear as a sidhe (pronounced 'shee') lover for a night, and turn even a sidhe or a sidhe-descendant into his sexual slave.

In the process of solving the case, Merry's secret is revealed, and she is hunted by the demonic Sluagh. Brought to see their King, Sholto, he offers Meredith a deal. Himself disapproved of by Andais, Queen of Air and Darkness, because of his mixed blood, he proposes an alliance between the two of them. Jealous at the idea of Merry becoming his lover, Sholto's harem of nighthags attack Merry. During the fight Merry's gift, the Hand of Flesh, is revealed when one of them, Nerys, turns into a ball of flesh.

Shocked, Merry tries to flee, but is trapped. Doyle, Captain of the Queen's Raven Guard, appears. He announces that the Queen never sent the Sluagh, and that in fact the Queen meant her no harm. As proof of this he produces the Queen's sword Mortal Dread, as well as the Queen's mark, which he transfers to Merry in a kiss.

Merry returns with Doyle to the Court. The Queen claims that she wants her bloodline to continue upon the throne. She is willing to take as her heir whichever of Meredith or her cousin, Cel, can first produce an heir. She lifts the geiss of celibacy upon her Ravens for Meredith alone, insisting that she choose at least three in order to increase the chance of pregnancy.

While this offer would permit Merry to end her self-imposed exile and return home, it also brings dangers. Cel, previously the sole heir, makes several attempts upon her life.  Merry makes alliances with others such as Kurag, the Goblin King.

However, Cel was behind the Branwyn's Tears incident in LA. In punishment, he is to be confined for six months after being coated with the oil himself, something akin to torture.

Characters

Major characters
A Kiss of Shadows features the following major characters:
 Andais - Queen of Air and Darkness, Merry's aunt, the sister of Essus, and mother of Cel. Andais is a war goddess, and the sadistic Queen of the Unseelie Court. Her personal guard, called the "Queen's Ravens" is composed exclusively of men.  Although she is a sadist and is widely believed to be insane, Andais appears to have the best interests of the Court at heart and has sworn to abdicate her throne in favor of whichever of Cel or Merry can demonstrate themselves capable of producing new sidhe children. Her current consort is Eamon.
 Barinthus - A sea god and one of the Queen's Ravens, Barinthus is one of the most powerful members of the Courts. He has long been called the "Kingmaker" for his involvement in the selection of court rulers.  He supported first Essus and now Merry for the Unseelie throne.
 Cel - Prince of Old Blood and son of Andais.  His personal guard is made up entirely of women.
 Doyle - Captain of the Queen's Ravens.  Often referred to as the Queen's Darkness (or simply as my Darkness by the Queen.)
 Frost - Doyle's second-in-command, one of the Queen's Ravens. Often referred to as Killing Frost.
 Galen - The youngest member of the Queen's Ravens and also Merry's best friend. Lineage is half-pixie and half Unseelie sidhe. Powers include subtle ability to have everyone like him. Extremely unpolitical, naive and idealistic. He is the voice of childhood reasoning for Merry. Unfortunately, letting go of those ideals is allowing Merry to survive.
 Jeremy Grey - Owner of the Grey Detective Agency, Trowe.
 Kitto  - Goblin/sidhe/snake hybrid, given to Merry by Kurag as part of their alliance.
 Kurag - King of Goblins, Merry's ally. Was ally of Merry's father prior to his death. Has a conjoined twin that is attached to the side of his head.  When formally addressed by Merry, she addresses both Kruag and his twin.
 Meredith NicEssus/Merry Gentry - Title heroine, Princess, Daughter of Essus.
 Nicca - One of the Queen's Ravens, and a spy for Queen Andais.
 Rhys - Raven, former God of Death. Film Noir buff.
 Sholto - King of the Sluagh, One of Queen Andais' Ravens.
 Siobhan - Captain of the King's Guard, Cel's right hand and personal Killer. Can kill with a touch.

Other characters
Recurring characters include:
 Barry Jenkins - Human newspaper reporter.
 Black Agnes - Nighthag, Member of the Sluagh and Sholto's lover.
 Ringo - Formerly a human gang member, but turned fae after saving some sidhe who ended up in the wrong place at the wrong time. 
 Griffin - One of the Queen's Ravens, Merry's ex-fiancée
 Prince Essus - Unseelie Sidhe, Merry's father, Andais' brother.
 Besaba - Seelie Sidhe, Merry's mother, who is part brownie part sidhe.
 Queen Niceven - Queen of the demi-Fey
 Eamon - One of the Queen's Ravens, Consort of Queen Andais, father of Prince Cel. Now works for the Grey Detective Agency.
 Roane Finn - Merry's lover and colleague at the Grey Detective Agency, a Roan or Selkie
 Segna the Gold - A nighthag and member of the Sluagh.
 Teresa - The Grey Detective Agency's resident psychic
 Uther - A Jack-in-Irons who works for the Grey Detective Agency.

Non-recurring characters include:
 Alistair Norton - Fae wannabe
 Eileen Galan - Lawyer
 Gethin - one of the Sluagh
 Frances Norton - Wife of Alistair Norton who approaches the Grey Agency for help with a death spell.
 Keelin - a Brownie who was Merry's childhood friend and is now Cel's lover.
 Lucinda Tate - Detective
 Maury Klein - Security specialist
 Naomi Phelps - Lover of Alistair Norton who approaches the Grey Agency for help
 Nerys the Grey - A nighthag and member of the Sluagh.
 Raimundo Alvera - Detective
 Conri - One of the Queen's Ravens

The death toll in A Kiss of Shadows includes:
 Alistair Norton - Killed by being eaten by spiders
 Nerys the Grey - Killed by Merry when Hand of Flesh appears.
 Pasco - One of the Queen's Ravens. Died during attack on Merry, turned inside out and joined to twin Rozwyn.  Tossed down the endless pit
 Rozenwyn - Died during attack on Merry. turned inside out and joined to twin Pasco.  Tossed down the endless pit

External links
Official website
Official blog
Merry Gentry Index

Merry Gentry (series)
2000 American novels
American alternate history novels
American erotic novels
American horror novels
Fictional fairies and sprites
Novels set in Los Angeles
Ballantine Books books